In physics, relativistic angular momentum refers to the mathematical formalisms and physical concepts that define angular momentum in special relativity (SR) and general relativity (GR). The relativistic quantity is subtly different from the three-dimensional quantity in classical mechanics.

Angular momentum is an important dynamical quantity derived from position and momentum. It is a measure of an object's rotational motion and resistance to changes in its rotation. Also, in the same way momentum conservation corresponds to translational symmetry, angular momentum conservation corresponds to rotational symmetry – the connection between symmetries and conservation laws is made by Noether's theorem. While these concepts were originally discovered in classical mechanics, they are also true and significant in special and general relativity. In terms of abstract algebra, the invariance of angular momentum, four-momentum, and other symmetries in spacetime, are described by the Lorentz group, or more generally the Poincaré group.

Physical quantities that remain separate in classical physics are naturally combined in SR and GR by enforcing the postulates of relativity. Most notably, the space and time coordinates combine into the four-position, and energy and momentum combine into the four-momentum. The components of these four-vectors depend on the frame of reference used, and change under Lorentz transformations to other inertial frames or accelerated frames.

Relativistic angular momentum is less obvious. The classical definition of angular momentum is the cross product of position x with momentum p to obtain a pseudovector , or alternatively as the exterior product to obtain a second order antisymmetric tensor . What does this combine with, if anything? There is another vector quantity not often discussed – it is the time-varying moment of mass polar-vector (not the moment of inertia) related to the boost of the centre of mass of the system, and this combines with the classical angular momentum pseudovector to form an antisymmetric tensor of second order, in exactly the same way as the electric field polar-vector combines with the magnetic field pseudovector to form the electromagnetic field antisymmetric tensor. For rotating mass–energy distributions (such as gyroscopes, planets, stars, and black holes) instead of point-like particles, the angular momentum tensor is expressed in terms of the stress–energy tensor of the rotating object.

In special relativity alone, in the rest frame of a spinning object, there is an intrinsic angular momentum analogous to the "spin" in quantum mechanics and relativistic quantum mechanics, although for an extended body rather than a point particle. In relativistic quantum mechanics, elementary particles have spin and this is an additional contribution to the orbital angular momentum operator, yielding the total angular momentum tensor operator. In any case, the intrinsic "spin" addition to the orbital angular momentum of an object can be expressed in terms of the Pauli–Lubanski pseudovector.

Definitions

Orbital 3d angular momentum

For reference and background, two closely related forms of angular momentum are given.

In classical mechanics, the orbital angular momentum of a particle with instantaneous three-dimensional position vector  and momentum vector , is defined as the axial vector

A related definition is to conceive orbital angular momentum as a plane element. This can be achieved by replacing the cross product by the exterior product in the language of exterior algebra, and angular momentum becomes a contravariant second order antisymmetric tensor

or writing  and momentum vector , the components can be compactly abbreviated in tensor index notation

where the indices  and  take the values 1, 2, 3. On the other hand, the components can be systematically displayed fully in a 3 × 3 antisymmetric matrix

This quantity is additive, and for an isolated system, the total angular momentum of a system is conserved.

Dynamic mass moment

In classical mechanics, the three-dimensional quantity for a particle of mass m moving with velocity u

has the dimensions of mass moment – length multiplied by mass. It is equal to the mass of the particle or system of particles multiplied by the distance from the space origin to the centre of mass (COM) at the time origin (t=0), as measured in the lab frame. There is no universal symbol, nor even a universal name, for this quantity. Different authors may denote it by other symbols if any (for example μ), may designate other names, and may define N to be the negative of what is used here. The above form has the advantage that it resembles the familiar Galilean transformation for position, which in turn is the non-relativistic boost transformation between inertial frames.

This vector is also additive: for a system of particles, the vector sum is the resultant

where the system's centre of mass position and velocity and total mass are respectively

For an isolated system, N is conserved in time, which can be seen by differentiating with respect to time. The angular momentum L is a pseudovector, but N is an "ordinary" (polar) vector, and is therefore invariant under inversion.

The resultant Ntot for a multiparticle system has the physical visualization that, whatever the complicated motion of all the particles are, they move in such a way that the system's COM moves in a straight line. This does not necessarily mean all particles "follow" the COM, nor that all particles all move in almost the same direction simultaneously, only that the motion of all the particles are constrained in relation to the centre of mass.

In special relativity, if the particle moves with velocity u relative to the lab frame, then

where

is the Lorentz factor and m is the mass (i.e. the rest mass) of the particle.

The Cartesian components are

Special relativity

Coordinate transformations for a boost in the x direction

Consider a coordinate frame  which moves with velocity  relative to another frame F, along the direction of the coincident  axes. The origins of the two coordinate frames coincide at times .

The Lorentz factor here applies to the velocity v, the relative velocity between the frames. This is not necessarily the same as the velocity u of an object.

For the orbital 3-angular momentum L as a pseudovector, we have

The parallel–perpendicular correspondence can be facilitated by splitting the entire 3-angular momentum pseudovector into components parallel (∥) and perpendicular (⊥) to v, in each frame,

Then the component equations can be collected into the pseudovector equations

Therefore, the components of angular momentum along the direction of motion do not change, while the components perpendicular do change. By contrast to the transformations of space and time, time and the spatial coordinates change along the direction of motion, while those perpendicular do not.

These transformations are true for all , not just for motion along the  axes.

Considering  as a tensor, we get a similar result

where

The boost of the dynamic mass moment along the  direction is

Collecting parallel and perpendicular components as before

Again, the components parallel to the direction of relative motion do not change, those perpendicular do change.

Vector transformations for a boost in any direction

So far these are only the parallel and perpendicular decompositions of the vectors. The transformations on the full vectors can be constructed from them as follows (throughout here  is a pseudovector for concreteness and compatibility with vector algebra).

while the perpendicular component by vector rejection of L or N from n

and the transformations are

or reinstating ,

These are very similar to the Lorentz transformations of the electric field  and magnetic field , see Classical electromagnetism and special relativity.

Alternatively, starting from the vector Lorentz transformations of time, space, energy, and momentum, for a boost with velocity ,

inserting these into the definitions

gives the transformations.

4d angular momentum as a bivector

In relativistic mechanics, the COM boost and orbital 3-space angular momentum of a rotating object are combined into a four-dimensional bivector in terms of the four-position X and the four-momentum P of the object

In components

which are six independent quantities altogether. Three components

are those of the familiar classical 3-space orbital angular momentum, and the other three

The tensor is antisymmetric;

The components of the tensor can be systematically displayed as a matrix

The lines are merely inserted to show where the blocks are.

Again, this tensor is additive: the total angular momentum of a system is the sum of the angular momentum tensors for each constituent of the system:

Each of the six components forms a conserved quantity when aggregated with the corresponding components for other objects and fields.

The angular momentum tensor M is indeed a tensor, the components change according to a Lorentz transformation matrix Λ, as illustrated in the usual way by tensor index notation

where, for a boost (without rotations) with normalized velocity , the Lorentz transformation matrix elements are

and the covariant βi and contravariant βi components of β are the same since these are just parameters.

In other words, one can Lorentz-transform the four position and four momentum separately, and then antisymmetrize those newly found components to obtain the angular momentum tensor in the new frame.

Rigid body rotation

For a particle moving in a curve, the cross product of its angular velocity  (a pseudovector) and position  give its tangential velocity

The maximum angular velocity of any massive object therefore depends on the size of the object.

For every point in the object, there is a maximum angular velocity.

The angular velocity (pseudovector) is related to the angular momentum (pseudovector) through the moment of inertia tensor 

(the dot  denotes tensor contraction on one index). The relativistic angular momentum is also limited by the size of the object.

Spin in special relativity

Four-spin 

A particle may have a "built-in" angular momentum independent of its motion, called spin and denoted s. It is a 3d pseudovector like orbital angular momentum L.

The spin has a corresponding spin magnetic moment, so if the particle is subject to interactions (like electromagnetic fields or spin-orbit coupling), the direction of the particle's spin vector will change, but its magnitude will be constant.

The extension to special relativity is straightforward. For some lab frame F, let F′ be the rest frame of the particle and suppose the particle moves with constant 3-velocity u. Then F′ is boosted with the same velocity and the Lorentz transformations apply as usual; it is more convenient to use . As a four-vector in special relativity, the four-spin S generally takes the usual form of a four-vector with a timelike component st and spatial components s, in the lab frame

although in the rest frame of the particle, it is defined so the timelike component is zero and the spatial components are those of particle's actual spin vector, in the notation here s′, so in the particle's frame

Equating norms leads to the invariant relation

so if the magnitude of spin is given in the rest frame of the particle and lab frame of an observer, the magnitude of the timelike component st is given in the lab frame also.

The covariant constraint on the spin is orthogonality to the velocity vector,

In 3-vector notation for explicitness, the transformations are

The inverse relations

are the components of spin the lab frame, calculated from those in the particle's rest frame. Although the spin of the particle is constant for a given particle, it appears to be different in the lab frame.

The Pauli–Lubanski pseudovector

The Pauli–Lubanski pseudovector

applies to both massive and massless particles.

Spin–orbital decomposition
In general, the total angular momentum tensor splits into an orbital component and a spin component,

This applies to a particle, a mass–energy–momentum distribution, or field.

Angular momentum of a mass–energy–momentum distribution

Angular momentum from the mass–energy–momentum tensor

The following is a summary from MTW. Throughout for simplicity, Cartesian coordinates are assumed.
In special and general relativity, a distribution of mass–energy–momentum, e.g. a fluid, or a star, is described by the stress–energy tensor Tβγ (a second order tensor field depending on space and time). Since T00 is the energy density, Tj0 for j = 1, 2, 3 is the jth component of the object's 3d momentum per unit volume, and Tij form components of the stress tensor including shear and normal stresses, the orbital angular momentum density about the position 4-vector β is given by a 3rd order tensor

This is antisymmetric in α and β. In special and general relativity, T is a symmetric tensor, but in other contexts (e.g., quantum field theory), it may not be.

Let Ω be a region of 4d spacetime. The boundary is a 3d spacetime hypersurface ("spacetime surface volume" as opposed to "spatial surface area"), denoted ∂Ω where "∂" means "boundary".

where dΣγ is the volume 1-form playing the role of a unit vector normal to a 2d surface in ordinary 3d Euclidean space. The integral is taken over the coordinates X, not . The integral within a spacelike surface of constant time is

which collectively form the angular momentum tensor.

Angular momentum about the centre of mass

There is an intrinsic angular momentum in the centre-of-mass frame, in other words, the angular momentum about any event

on the wordline of the object's center of mass. Since T00 is the energy density of the object, the spatial coordinates of the center of mass are given by

Setting Y = XCOM obtains the orbital angular momentum density about the centre-of-mass of the object.

Angular momentum conservation 

The conservation of energy–momentum is given in differential form by the continuity equation

where ∂γ is the four-gradient. (In non-Cartesian coordinates and general relativity this would be replaced by the covariant derivative). The total angular momentum conservation is given by another continuity equation

The integral equations use Gauss' theorem in spacetime

Torque in special relativity

The torque acting on a point-like particle is defined as the derivative of the angular momentum tensor given above with respect to proper time:

or in tensor components:

where F is the 4d force acting on the particle at the event X. As with angular momentum, torque is additive, so for an extended object one sums or integrates over the distribution of mass.

Angular momentum as the generator of spacetime boosts and rotations

The angular momentum tensor is the generator of boosts and rotations for the Lorentz group. Lorentz boosts can be parametrized by rapidity, and a 3d unit vector  pointing in the direction of the boost, which combine into the "rapidity vector"

where  is the speed of the relative motion divided by the speed of light. Spatial rotations can be parametrized by the axis–angle representation, the angle  and a unit vector  pointing in the direction of the axis, which combine into an "axis-angle vector"

Each unit vector only has two independent components, the third is determined from the unit magnitude. Altogether there are six parameters of the Lorentz group; three for rotations and three for boosts. The (homogeneous) Lorentz group is 6-dimensional.

The boost generators  and rotation generators  can be combined into one generator for Lorentz transformations;  the antisymmetric angular momentum tensor, with components

and correspondingly, the boost and rotation parameters are collected into another antisymmetric four-dimensional matrix , with entries:

where the summation convention over the repeated indices i, j, k has been used to prevent clumsy summation signs. The general Lorentz transformation is then given by the matrix exponential

and the summation convention has been applied to the repeated matrix indices α and β.

The general Lorentz transformation Λ is the transformation law for any four vector A = (A0, A1, A2, A3), giving the components of this same 4-vector in another inertial frame of reference

The angular momentum tensor forms 6 of the 10 generators of the Poincaré group, the other four are the components of the four-momentum for spacetime translations.

Angular momentum in general relativity

The angular momentum of test particles in a gently curved background is more complicated in GR but can be generalized in a straightforward manner.  If the Lagrangian is expressed with respect to angular variables as the generalized coordinates, then the angular momenta are the functional derivatives of the Lagrangian with respect to the angular velocities.  Referred to Cartesian coordinates, these are typically given by the off-diagonal shear terms of the spacelike part of the stress–energy tensor.  If the spacetime supports a Killing vector field tangent to a circle, then the angular momentum about the axis is conserved.

One also wishes to study the effect of a compact, rotating mass on its surrounding spacetime.  The prototype solution is of the Kerr metric, which describes the spacetime around an axially symmetric black hole.  It is obviously impossible to draw a point on the event horizon of a Kerr black hole and watch it circle around.  However, the solution does support a constant of the system that acts mathematically similarly to an angular momentum.

See also

References

Further reading

Special relativity

General relativity

External links

Angular momentum
Dynamics (mechanics)
General relativity
Rotation
Special relativity